Uhlstädt-Kirchhasel is a municipality in the district Saalfeld-Rudolstadt, in Thuringia, Germany. On 1 December 2007, the former municipalities Großkochberg and Heilingen were incorporated by Uhlstädt-Kirchhasel.
The valley of the river Saale is the centre of Uhlstädt-Kirchhasel. Both Uhlstädt and Kirchhasel are villages inside this valley, which divides the municipality into a northern and a southern part. The nearest bigger towns are Rudolstadt (about 7 km away), Saalfeld (about 11 km away) and  Jena (about 25 km away).

The 32 local subdivisions of this municipality are:(inhabitants)

History
The municipality Uhlstädt-Kirchhasel was founded on 1 July 2002 by a voluntary fusion of the municipalities Beutelsdorf, Dorndorf, Engerda, Kirchhasel, Niederkrossen, Rödelwitz, Schloßkulm, Schmieden, Teichweiden, Uhlstädt and Zeutsch, which were independent before this fusion. On 1 December 2007 the municipalities Großkochberg and Heilingen, which were independent until this point too, become also part of the municipality Uhlstädt-Kirchhasel.

References

External links
Homepage of the municipality (http://uhlstaedt-kirchhasel.de/)

Municipalities in Thuringia
Saalfeld-Rudolstadt